The 1977 NBA playoffs was the postseason tournament of the National Basketball Association's 1976–77 season. The tournament concluded with the Western Conference champion Portland Trail Blazers defeating the Eastern Conference champion Philadelphia 76ers 4 games to 2 in the NBA Finals. Bill Walton was named NBA Finals MVP.

Portland won the NBA title in its first playoff appearance, something that had not taken place since the early days of the BAA (and has not since, as of 2022). The Trail Blazers went 10-0 at home in the playoffs.

This was the first NBA playoffs after the ABA-NBA merger; two of the former ABA teams (the San Antonio Spurs and Denver Nuggets) made their playoff debuts in their first NBA season. The New Jersey Nets made their playoff debut in 1979, and the Indiana Pacers in 1981.

The NBA Playoffs added 1 more team from each conference, for a total of 12 contestants, up from 10 the previous year. Also, the two division winners in each conference were automatically given a first-round bye and started the playoffs in the conference semifinals.

This was the Detroit Pistons last playoff appearance of the decade and their last as a Western Conference team as they would move to the East in 1978. They would not make the postseason again until 1984.

After losing in the semifinals to Los Angeles, the Golden State Warriors wouldn't return to the playoffs again until 1987.

For the first time since 1956, the Eastern Conference Finals had neither the Celtics nor Knicks participating.

The referees went on strike during these playoffs. Two high-profile veterans, Richie Powers and Earl Strom, did not honor the strike and stayed on the job.

It was the first time since 1950 that the NBA Champion had to win 4 rounds.

Bracket

First round

Eastern Conference first round

(3) Washington Bullets vs. (6) Cleveland Cavaliers

 Nate Thurmond’s final NBA game.

This was the second playoff meeting between these two teams, with the Cavaliers winning the previous meeting.

(4) Boston Celtics vs. (5) San Antonio Spurs

This was the first playoff meeting between these two teams.

Western Conference first round

(3) Portland Trail Blazers vs. (6) Chicago Bulls

This was the first playoff meeting between these two teams.

(4) Golden State Warriors vs. (5) Detroit Pistons

This would be the last NBA playoff game in the city of Detroit until 2019. 

This was the third playoff meeting between these two teams, with the Warriors winning both previous encounters.

Conference semifinals

Eastern Conference semifinals

(1) Philadelphia 76ers vs. (4) Boston Celtics

 Jo Jo White's buzzer-beater.

This was the 14th playoff meeting between these two teams, with the Celtics winning eight of the first 13 meetings.

(2) Houston Rockets vs. (3) Washington Bullets

This was the first playoff meeting between these two teams.

Western Conference semifinals

(1) Los Angeles Lakers vs. (4) Golden State Warriors

This was the fifth playoff meeting between these two teams, with the Lakers winning three of the first four meetings.

(2) Denver Nuggets vs. (3) Portland Trail Blazers

This was the first playoff meeting between these two teams.

Conference finals

Eastern Conference finals

(1) Philadelphia 76ers vs. (2) Houston Rockets

 Controversial charging foul on John Lucas wipes out game-tying field goal with 5 seconds left.

This was the first playoff meeting between these two teams.

Western Conference finals

(1) Los Angeles Lakers vs. (3) Portland Trail Blazers

 Bill Walton's famous dunk on Kareem Abdul-Jabbar.

This was the first playoff meeting between these two teams.

NBA Finals: (E1) Philadelphia 76ers vs. (W3) Portland Trail Blazers

 Notable for a brawl between the Blazers' Maurice Lucas and the 76ers' Darryl Dawkins.

 Bill Walton's two famous plays of tipping the ball against Darryl Dawkins off an alley-oop from Bob Gross, then dunking the ball off of Dave Twardzik's steal and alley-oop pass.

 Portland becomes the second team in finals history, after the 1969 Celtics, to overcome a 2–0 series deficit.

This was the first playoff meeting between these two teams.

References

External links
 Basketball-Reference.com's 1977 NBA Playoffs page

National Basketball Association playoffs
Playoffs
Sports in Portland, Oregon

fi:NBA-kausi 1976–1977#Pudotuspelit